Liam Nash (born 19 January 1996) is an English semi-professional footballer who plays for Hornchurch, as a striker.

Club career
Nash began his career at local side Hullbridge Sports, before joining Isthmian League Premier Division side Billericay Town after impressing at a young age. Following his arrival, Nash began to struggle at Billericay and instead had loan spells at Great Wakering Rovers and Aveley.

Following permanent spells at Great Wakering Rovers and Aveley, Nash joined Maldon & Tiptree, where he netted 36 goals in 47 appearances in all competitions in the 2016–17 campaign. He turned professional in July 2017 with Gillingham. After making ten appearances for them, he signed on loan for Leatherhead in November 2017. On 22 October 2018, Nash joined Concord Rangers on loan.

In January 2019 he went on trial with Irish club Cork City. In February 2019 he signed for the club. His contract with the club was mutually terminated in April 2019.

On 15 May 2019 Nash joined National League South side Hemel Hempstead Town. In January 2020 he moved to Dartford.

On 29 June 2020, Nash joined Boca Gibraltar of the Gibraltar National League.

In October 2020, he returned to England to join Isthmian League side Hornchurch.

Career statistics

Honours
Hornchurch
 FA Trophy: 2020–21

References

1996 births
Living people
English footballers
Hullbridge Sports F.C. players
Billericay Town F.C. players
Great Wakering Rovers F.C. players
Aveley F.C. players
Maldon & Tiptree F.C. players
Gillingham F.C. players
Leatherhead F.C. players
Dulwich Hamlet F.C. players
Concord Rangers F.C. players
Cork City F.C. players
English Football League players
Association football forwards
Hemel Hempstead Town F.C. players
Dartford F.C. players
F.C. Boca Gibraltar players
League of Ireland players
English expatriate footballers
English expatriate sportspeople in Ireland
Expatriate association footballers in the Republic of Ireland
English expatriates in Gibraltar
Expatriate footballers in Gibraltar
National League (English football) players
Isthmian League players